The Eurovision Song Contest is an annual song competition.

Eurovision may also refer to:
 Eurovision (network), a TV network part of the European Broadcasting Union, that organises the Eurovision Song Contest and other Eurovision events
 "Euro-Vision", the 1980 Belgian entry to the Eurovision Song Contest
 Eurovision Song Contest: The Story of Fire Saga, a 2020 comedy film inspired by the Eurovision Song Contest
 The Eurovision Museum, a museum exhibition in Húsavík about the history of the contest.

See also
 
 Eurosong (disambiguation)